Anders Degn Randrup (born 16 July 1988) is a Danish former professional footballer who played as a right back.

Club career
Randrup played youth football alongside Daniel Wass in Avarta and later the Brøndby academy. As part of the latter club, former Brøndby head coach, Tom Køhlert often praised Randrups abilities, numerous times calling him a star player for the future. His first senior games for Brøndby were in the middle of one of the major crises of the club, struggling against relegation from the Danish Superliga, and Randrup initially failed to impress. However, in the second half of the 2007–08 season, with former Danish international Thomas Rytter demoted to the reserves, Randrup established himself as first choice for right back, and became an immediate fan- and media favourite after strong performances in the opening games.

In the summer of 2013, Randrup signed a two-year contract with AC Horsens, which had just been relegated from the Superliga to the 1st Division. There, he was appointed to replace Alexander Juel Andersen, who had just moved to AGF. Randrup made his official debut for Horsens on 28 July 2013, when he was substituted in the 71st minute instead of Henrik Toft in a 4–1 victory at home over Akademisk Boldklub.

After one year in Horsens, Randrup moved to FC Vestsjælland on 26 June 2014, where he signed a two-year contract. Vestsjælland picked him up on a free transfer. On 8 September 2014, Randrup suffered a knee injury in the Superliga match against Randers. Ten days later he underwent knee surgery and it was announced by the club that he would be sidelined for six months, after having played only three games in the previous season. He made a comeback in the Superliga in the last round when he was in the starting lineup and played all 90 minutes on 7 June 2015 in a 3–1 victory at home over Silkeborg.

On 21 December 2015 it was confirmed, that Randrup had signed a contract with IF Elfsborg in Sweden.

After a few years in Sweden, Randrup returned to Denmark on 1 September 2020, signing with Danish 1st Division club Hvidovre IF. Randrup decided to retire on 15 December 2020.

International career
On 22 March 2008, Randrup was called up for the national team for a friendly game against the Czech Republic, where he came on as a substitute after 60 minutes for Thomas Kristensen, thus receiving his first cap.

References

External links
National team profile
Career statistics at Danmarks Radio

1988 births
Living people
Danish men's footballers
Danish expatriate men's footballers
Denmark international footballers
Denmark under-21 international footballers
Denmark youth international footballers
BK Avarta players
Brøndby IF players
AC Horsens players
FC Vestsjælland players
IF Elfsborg players
Helsingborgs IF players
Hvidovre IF players
Danish Superliga players
Allsvenskan players
Superettan players
Association football defenders
People from Herlev Municipality
Danish expatriate sportspeople in Sweden
Expatriate footballers in Sweden
Danish 1st Division players
Sportspeople from the Capital Region of Denmark